The list of ship commissionings in 1877 includes a chronological list of all ships commissioned in 1877.


See also

References

1877
 Ship commissionings